Pavel Sokol (born 7 July 1996) is a Czech footballer who currently plays as a left midfielder for MFK Chrudim on loan from FK Pardubice.

Club career

FC Zbrojovka Brno
Since the summer of 2016 he was a member of the U21 team.

1. SC Znojmo
He made his professional debut for Znojmo in the away match against Vítkovice on 8 April 2017, which ended in a loss 0:3.

FK Pardubice
In the summer of 2017, Sokol completed a loan move to Pardubice. He played 24 times that season, mostly off the bench, which earned him a permanent move that was announced on 17 June 2018.

References

External links
 Profile at FC Zbrojovka Brno official site
 

1996 births
Living people
Czech footballers
Czech expatriate footballers
Czech First League players
FK Pardubice players
Association football midfielders
1. SC Znojmo players
FC Zbrojovka Brno players
FC Petržalka players
MFK Chrudim players
Czech National Football League players
2. Liga (Slovakia) players
Czech expatriate sportspeople in Slovakia
Expatriate footballers in Slovakia
People from Chrudim
Sportspeople from the Pardubice Region